Nothing: Something to Believe in is a 2007 book by Nica Lalli that offers a personal account of atheism.

References

External links
Description from Prometheus Books
Nica Lalli

2007 non-fiction books
Books critical of religion
Books about atheism
Prometheus Books books